Noor Akid bin Nordin (born 28 October 1996) is a Singaporean footballer currently playing as a midfielder for Albirex Niigata Singapore of the Singapore Premier League.

Career statistics

Club

Notes

References

External links
 

1996 births
Living people
Singaporean footballers
Association football midfielders
Singapore Premier League players
Home United FC players
Balestier Khalsa FC players
Albirex Niigata Singapore FC players